This is a list of solar eclipses in the 16th century. During the period 1501 to 1600 there were 228 solar eclipses of which 75 were partial, 72 were annular (three non-central), 62 were total, and 19 were hybrids. The greatest number of eclipses in one year was four, occurring in 1508, 1526, 1573, and 1591. Note that dates before October 4, 1582 use the Julian calendar and dates after October 15, 1582 use the Gregorian calendar (October 4, 1582 is followed by October 15 in the Gregorian calendar).

References

 
16th century-related lists
+16